Bussière is a surname. Notable people with the name include:

 Gaston Bussière (1862–1928/29), French Symbolist painter and illustrator
 Thomas A. Bussiere (born 1963), American lieutenant general
 Théo Bussière (born 1995), French competitive breaststroke swimmer
 Franck Bussière (born 1975), French lightweight rower

See also
 Bussières